Lyuksyugyun is a rural locality (a selo), and one of three settlements in Aryktakhsky Rural Okrug of Kobyaysky District in the Sakha Republic, Russia, in addition to Aryktakh, the administrative center of the Rural Okrug and Khatyryk-Khomo. Its population as of the 2002 Census was 216.

References

Notes

Sources
Official website of the Sakha Republic. Registry of the Administrative-Territorial Divisions of the Sakha Republic. Kobyaysky District. 

Rural localities in Kobyaysky District